Donald Portway, CBE, TD, DL, JP, MA, FICE (b Halstead 28 June 1887 - d Cambridge 19 March 1979) was a 20th-century academic, soldier and author.

Portway was educated at Felsted School and Downing College, Cambridge. He was an assistant master at Britannia Royal Naval College, Dartmouth from 1912 to 1914 when he joined the Royal Engineers. In 1918 he became a Fellow of St Catharine's College, Cambridge. In 1919 he became a lecturer in Engineering at the university. He was subsequently Tutor, Senior Tutor and President of St Catharine's before becoming its Master in 1946,  a post he held until 1957. He was Dean of the Faculty of Engineering and Professor of Mechanical Engineering at the University of Khartoum from 1957 until his retirement in 1961.

References

People from Essex
People educated at Felsted School
20th-century English educators
Masters of St Catharine's College, Cambridge
Fellows of St Catharine's College, Cambridge
Alumni of Downing College, Cambridge
1979 deaths
1887 births
Royal Engineers officers
Fellows of the Institution of Civil Engineers
Commanders of the Order of the British Empire
English justices of the peace
Engineering academics at the University of Cambridge
Academic staff of the University of Khartoum
20th-century British engineers
Military personnel from Essex